Thomas Beck (December 29, 1909 – September 23, 1995) was an American film and stage actor during the mid to late 1930s, who first attracted attention playing juvenile leads in several Charlie Chan and Mr. Moto films.

Early life
Born in New York City, Beck entered college with the intention of becoming a doctor but abandoned that for engineering.

Career
His first professional work was in a stock company and he later played on Broadway. His work interested film executives who sent him to Hollywood. Beck was featured in 28 films in his career, with notable roles  in several Charlie Chan films: Charlie Chan in Paris (1935), Charlie Chan in Egypt (1935), Charlie Chan at the Race Track (1936), and Charlie Chan at the Opera (1936). He also worked opposite Will Rogers in Life Begins at 40 (1935), in which he played the spoiled son of a landowner; appeared as a French legionnaire in Under Two Flags (1936), played Pastor Schultz, the village priest, in Shirley Temple's 1937 film Heidi; and appeared opposite Temple's counterpart Jane Withers in Can This Be Dixie? (1936). He was seen to good advantage in two 1936 Fox motion pictures, in which he had leading roles: as a pilot in Peter Lorre's first American film, the espionage thriller Crack-Up and as a rich socialite in Champagne Charlie.

He also worked to promote the Screen Actors Guild to improve working conditions for actors, and when his career seemed ready to take off he suddenly left movie work in 1939 after the studio tried to reduce his wages. He then served in the Army, serving in the Pacific theatre during World War II, finishing as a major in 1945. He briefly returned to the theatre in 1946, appearing with Blanche Yurka in Temper the Wind, in New York City.

Death
Beck died after battling Alzheimer's disease and heart conditions in Miami Shores, Florida on September 23, 1995. He is buried in Loudon Park Cemetery, Baltimore, Maryland.

References

External links

 
 
 

1909 births
1995 deaths
American male film actors
Male actors from New York City
Deaths from Alzheimer's disease
Deaths from dementia in Florida
20th-century American male actors